Petty Enterprises (formerly Lee Petty Engineering) was a NASCAR racing team based in Level Cross, North Carolina, USA. It was founded by Lee Petty with his two sons Richard Petty and Maurice Petty. The team was later owned by Richard Petty, his son Kyle Petty and Boston Ventures. At the time of its folding the team operated the No. 43 and No. 45 Dodge Chargers in the NASCAR Sprint Cup Series. Petty Enterprises ran from 1949 until 2008.  The team closed shop in January 2009 and merged with Gillett Evernham Motorsports after sponsorship could not be found for any of the cars in the Petty stable; the merged team took the name Richard Petty Motorsports, adopting a logo similar to that of Petty Enterprises' logo. In 2021, Richard Petty Motorsports became Petty GMS Motorsports, and in 2023 the team rebranded as Legacy Motor Club.

Petty Enterprises formerly held the title of winningest team in NASCAR Cup Series for 61 years, beginning in 1960 with a win by Lee Petty. At the time of the team's final victory, it totaled 268 wins in the series. In 2021, Hendrick Motorsports eclipsed the record, winning its 269th race in the Coca-Cola 600 with Kyle Larson.

Old race shop in Level Cross
The facilities in Randleman that was vacated by the race team is still owned by the Petty family and is now (since 2010) a small business called The Petty Garage and specializes in custom cars, vintage restorations, and other specialty automotive work. The last few years has seen it host Mopar (Chrysler Co. vehicles) appreciation meets.

Car No. 42, 7 history

Lee Petty (1949-1961)
Founded as Lee Petty Engineering, Lee Petty brought Petty Enterprises their first starts, the first of these at Occoneechee Speedway, where Petty finished ninth. The team's first win came that year in Lee's fifth start at Heidelberg Raceway, with Petty and the team finishing 2nd in points that season. Petty won one race in each of the years 1950 and 1951, before collecting three victories in 1952. Lee grabbed five wins in 1953 and finished second in points before winning the championship in 1954. He followed that with six wins the next season and two more the following year, making him one of the most dominating drivers in the series at that time. In 1957, Petty won four races as the team began running additional teams. Petty would accumulate a total of 54 career wins, one of them being the inaugural Daytona 500 in 1959, and three national championships. But during the 100 Mile Qualifying Races for the 1961 Daytona 500, Petty was involved in a horrific crash with Johnny Beauchamp, this would hospitalize both drivers, and Petty would only make a handful of starts between 1962 and 1965.

Lee's sons, Richard and Maurice Petty, would also make a few starts in their father's cars in the early part of their careers. Several other drivers raced a handful of times in the No. 42, including Marvin Panch, Paul Lewis, Tiny Lund, G.C. Spencer, and Dan Gurney.

Kyle Petty (1979-1984)
The year of 1979 saw Richard's son, Kyle Petty, start his career winning the very first race he entered - the Arca 200 at Daytona International Speedway, Petty drove five cup races for PE in 1979.
 

In 1983, the No. 42 became the #7 due to Kyle Petty's 7-Eleven-sponsorship. Kyle earned eight Top 5's, but no wins during that stretch. Petty left to drive for the Wood Brothers in 1985, taking the sponsor with him and causing the team to shut down.

Car No. 43, 44 history

Pre-Richard Petty years (1954-1958)
Believed to be one of the most recognizable numbers in motorsports, the No. 43 team debuted in 1954, when Lee Petty expanded to a two car team and put Bob Welborn in the driver's seat. Welborn competed in two races that season; West Palm Beach and Savannah, finishing 11th and 20th, respectively. The #43 would not return with Petty Enterprises until 1957, this time with Bill Lutz behind the wheel. Lutz drove his Oldsmobile to a 6th-place finish at Daytona Beach. The 43 car would once again take a break from competition until 1959, when Lee placed his son Richard in the car.

Richard Petty (1959-1992)
Richard made ten starts in 1959, accumulating five top tens, and four top fives making him the 1959 Rookie of the Year.  Petty returned in 1960, making forty starts, with three wins, sixteen top fives, and thirty top tens. He finished second in NASCAR Grand National Series points, scoring his first career win at Charlotte Fairgrounds Speedway. Petty scored ten wins throughout 1961 and 1962, finishing eighth and second in championship standings. Although he had tremendous success early in his career, his true breakout year was 1963. In '63, Petty scored fourteen wins, thirty top fives, thirty-nine top tens, and eight poles. However, he still fell short of the championship, finishing second to Joe Weatherly.

1964 saw Richard win his first Grand National title, and first Daytona 500. Joining in the Chrysler boycott of NASCAR due to the ban of the Hemi engine, Petty spent most of 1965 drag racing, and only made fourteen out of fifty-five races on the circuit. In 1966, Petty returned to NASCAR. Winning yet another Daytona 500, and finishing third in points. 1967 was a monumental year for Richard. He compiled twenty-seven wins out of forty-eight starts, including a record ten wins in a row. One of these victories was the Southern 500 at Darlington Raceway. This would be his only win in the Southern 500. His dominance in this season dubbed him the nickname of, "King Richard." He had previously been known as the "Randleman Rocket."  He also scored his second Grand National Series championship during that season. Petty continued this success in 1968, although he finished third in final points ranking. In 1969, Petty switched brands to Ford, as Richard believed his Plymouth was not as competitive on superspeedways. He requested to run a Dodge Daytona, but Chrysler executives insisted he stay with Plymouth. He would take home ten race wins, and finish second in points. In 1970 Plymouth developed their own version of the Dodge Daytona, the Plymouth Superbird. It had the features Richard wanted, and he switched back to Plymouth for the 1970 season. 1971 was a year of "threes" for Petty, he won his third Daytona 500 and third championship, edging over Virginia driver, James Hylton. Richard would win twenty-one races that year, making him the first stock car racing driver in history to win over $1,000,000. At the end of the 1971 season, Chrysler announced they would no longer factory-back the Pettys.

In 1972, STP began a long, very successful sponsorship arrangement with the team. However, it put an end to the years of famous all "Petty Blue" cars. Initially, STP insisted the car be all orangish-red. But after a lengthy negotiation session, they decided on a car that would be a combination of the "Petty Blue" and the "STP Red." This paint scheme would become the one of all STP sponsored race car, most notably Gordon Johncock's 1982 Indianapolis 500 winning automobile. Thanks to his eight victories, twenty-five top fives, and twenty-eight top tens, Petty won his fourth series title, making him the inaugural Winston Cup champion. In 1973, Petty completed his first full-time season in a Dodge Charger (he had tested them in 1972.) 1973 also saw Petty's fourth Daytona 500 victory, outlasting Buddy Baker's K&K Insurance Racing Dodge. A year later, all NASCAR races were shortened due to the energy crisis. Petty would win the "Daytona 450," along with nine other races, winning his fifth championship.

1975 was another historic year for Petty, as he won the World 600 in Charlotte for the first time in his career, en route to twelve more victories and his sixth series title. The thirteen wins is a modern era (1972–Present) record, tied by Jeff Gordon in 1998. In 1976, Petty was involved in one of the most famous finishes in NASCAR history. He and David Pearson were battling for the win on the last lap of the Daytona 500. When Petty tried to pass Pearson coming out of turn four, his right bumper and Pearson's left front bumper touched. Pearson and Petty both spun and hit the wall. Petty's car came to rest just yards before the start/finish line, but his engine had stalled. Pearson had struck the wall and clipped another car, but his engine was running. Although Team Petty tried to push-start Richard, Pearson would end up winning the race. 1978 was another big year for Petty, not because of his success, but because of his lack of success. This very well could've been the only year in Petty's prime where he did not visit the Winner's Circle. The team could not get their Dodge Magnum to handle the way they wanted, even though they spent countless hours trying to improve the car's performance.

Unhappy with his 1978 results, Petty decided to part ways with Chrysler, and began racing General Motors vehicles. This change proved very successful as Petty scored six top ten finishes in the last ten races of the season. He would go on to have even better results in 1979. He kicked off the season with winning the Daytona 500, the sixth of his career, and the first live flag-to-flag broadcast of a NASCAR race. This race became infamous for a fistfight between competitors Donnie Allison and Cale Yarborough after the race. Allison and Yarborough were running first and second on the last lap when they crashed, allowing Petty to sneak by. The race is also regarded as being the turning point of modern-day NASCAR. The East Coast was snowed in by a blizzard, giving CBS a captive audience.  He ran most of the remaining races that season in a Chevrolet, winning four additional times, and his seventh and final NASCAR championship, beating Darrell Waltrip by eleven points. That would be the record for closest championship battle until 1992.

1980 was not a very good year for Petty, he only won twice. This is widely considered to be the first season of Richard's downfall. 1981 was slightly more promising. Prior to the 1981 season, NASCAR dictated that all teams had to downsize their cars to a 110" wheel-base. Even though Petty had been successful with General Motors cars, he wanted to return to his Mopar roots. So, in 1981 Petty revealed a brand new 1981 Dodge Mirada and took it to Daytona in January for testing. Petty's fans were also mostly Dodge fans, so when word got out about the Mirada, over 15,000 people attended just to watch Petty test. Unfortunately for Richard, the Dodge's top speed averaged at 186 miles per hour, about 8 miles per hour slower than his fellow GM and Ford competitors. So, Petty abandoned the Dodge Mirada, and purchased a Buick Regal for the Daytona 500. Petty would end up winning the 500 for the seventh and last time thanks to a strategic late-race pit stop. While Petty would win three races in 1981, Petty was still disappointed in his results and concluded that the Regals were poor in reliability and ill-handling. For the 1982 season, he moved to the Pontiac Grand Prix. At first, the Grand Prix behaved much like the 1978 Dodge Magnum, but towards the end of the year things began to improve. Richard would end the season with three victories, nine top fives, and twenty-one top tens.

Richard would leave Petty Enterprises after the 1983 season, moving to Curb Racing in hopes his statistics would improve. In 1986 Richard returned to his family's team. The following years would come with little success for struggling Petty, scoring a combined zero wins, fifteen top fives, and thirty-two top tens.

On October 1, 1991, Petty announced he would retire from racing after the 1992 season. Petty's final top ten finish came in the 1991 Budweiser at the Glen, which is the same race that claimed the life of veteran driver JD McDuffie. Petty's final season was dubbed the "Fan Appreciation Tour." This tour took him around the country, participating in special events, ceremonies, and fan meeting sessions. Petty would lead the field on the pace lap at every race as a salute to the fans.

Petty led the first five laps of the Pepsi 400 at Daytona, but dropped out on lap 84. Petty's final race came at the season-ending Hooters 500 at Atlanta Motor Speedway. Petty was involved in an accident on lap 94, but the team managed to restore the car and send him back out with two laps to go and Richard Petty was running at the finish in 35th position before taking one last lap after the race in a fender-less race car, with tear-filled eyes and a hand out the window, waving goodbye to his many fans.

Rick Wilson (1993)
After Richard Petty's retirement, the No. 43 was renumbered as the No. 44 and Rick Wilson was signed to drive for 1993. Wilson struggled, only placing in the top 10 once at Sonoma, and was released at the end of the season.

Wally Dallenbach Jr. / John Andretti (1994)
In 1994, the car was changed back to the King's famous number 43, and Wally Dallenbach Jr. was hired as the driver. Dallenbach tallied three top 10's and one top 5, but struggled to qualify races. He was replaced mid-season by John Andretti.

Bobby Hamilton (1995-1997)
For 1995, 1991 Winston Cup Rookie of the Year Bobby Hamilton was hired to drive. Hamilton would score four top fives, and scored his first win with the team the following year at Phoenix, this would be Petty Enterprises first win since 1983. In 1997 Hamilton won at Rockingham, but left the team at the end of the season to drive for Morgan-McClure Racing.

John Andretti (1998-2003)
In 1998, journeyman John Andretti was hired and he gave the team three Top 5's in his first year, and another win at Martinsville the following. This would ultimately be the final win for Petty Enterprises. In 2000, Andretti began to fail and he only scored two Top 10's. The next year, he did score one Top 5 at Bristol.

The team lost longtime sponsor STP in mid-2000 and changed to General Mills. The #43 team began a noticeable downward slide, and would not win another race in Cup competition until 2014 as Richard Petty Motorsports.

Christian Fittipaldi (2003) and Jeff Green (2003-2005)
2003 saw Andretti get released fourteen races into the season in favor of Brazilian driver Christian Fittipaldi, who struggled and was also released after ten races. Jeff Green took over for 2004–2005, with a best finish of seventh at Martinsville in 2004.

Bobby Labonte (2006-2008)
In 2006, the team brought in 2000 Winston Cup champion Bobby Labonte and former Hendrick Motorsports crew chief Robbie Loomis. Many analysts saw this combination as the key to putting Petty Enterprises back into victory lane. The team's first year together showed promise, Labonte finished 21st in the points with eight top tens. Late in the 2007 season, Petty Enterprises moved its shop into the old Robert Yates Racing facility in Mooresville, North Carolina. It would be the first time since the inception of the company that it wouldn't be located in Randleman, North Carolina. "PE believes that this is necessary to move forward with the team," Richard Petty said. "It's kind of hard for us and the people in the community to accept maybe we're not there anymore. We just feel for us to move forward and keep up with where NASCAR is going, we just felt we had to try to go somewhere else."  That year, Labonte improved to 18th in points. Labonte fell back to 21st in points in 2008, posting just two top-10 finishes Earlier in the year, General Mills announced they would leave the team to sponsor Richard Childress Racing's fourth cup car in 2009. Rumors surfaced in early December 2008 that Petty Enterprises may cease operations and liquidate its assets, since Boston Venture was unable to secure sponsorship for the No. 43.

Merger with Evernham Motorsports (2009)
In January 2009, Petty Enterprises merged with Gillett Evernham Motorsports and the No. 43 car was absorbed into the team.  Labonte left the team before the 2009 season, leaving the car with no driver and no sponsor for 2009. By January 2009, the only employees left were Robbie Loomis and Richard Petty himself. CEO David F. Zucker was reassigned to the Richard Petty Driving Experience, which Boston Ventures also controlled.
 
The team's merger with Gillett Evernham Motorsports moved the No. 43 over to that team, In 2021, RPM merged with GMS Racing and the No. 43 moved there where it is currently driven by Erik Jones.

Car No. 44 history

Maurice Petty (1960-1961)
The No. 44 debuted in 1960 with driver Maurice Petty, Petty finished eighth. Maurice returned with the #44 in 1961, finishing twenty-first at Bowman Gray Stadium.

Kyle Petty (1997-2000)
The No. 44 returned when Kyle Petty formed his own PE2 Motorsports team for the 1997 season. After 1998 the team merged into Petty Enterprises and Kyle became the team's new CEO. Midway through 2000 after his son Adam Petty was killed while practicing for a Busch Series race at New Hampshire International Speedway, Kyle elected to finish out Adam's Busch season in his No. 45 and would switch to using the No. 45 in Cup from the 2001 season onwards. Steve Grissom would complete the season in the No. 44.

Buckshot Jones (2001-2002)
The No. 44 became a Dodge team in 2001 with a sponsorship from Georgia-Pacific and Buckshot Jones driving. In his first year driving the car, Jones finished 41st in points, failing to qualify six times and not recording a single Top 10 finish. Jones returned in 2002 but again struggled, and was released approximately mid-season. Petty Enterprises hired several substitute drivers including Jerry Nadeau, who nearly led the team to victory at Sonoma in June, and Greg Biffle, who ran the last three races.

After being used sparingly over the next season, recent Petty signee Christian Fittipaldi was to take over the car for 2004, but was released.

In 2009, Petty said the No. 44 would return with McCumbee, but McCumbee said "the plans are up in the air" due to lack of funding. With the recent merger with Gillett Evernham Motorsports, those plans were completely scrapped and McCumbee was without a ride for 2009. The No. 44 instead took the place for the No. 10 at Richard Petty Motorsports, with A. J. Allmendinger driving.

Car No. 45 history

The No. 45 was not always part of Petty Enterprises.

Adam Petty (2000)
The team appeared to be on the rise again with fourth-generation driver Adam Petty joining the team. He made his first Winston Cup start in April 2000, and many experts believed he would be the future of the team. Kyle Petty was planning to move out of the cockpit soon after, and into the full-time ownership role of the team.

About a month and a half after his first career Winston Cup start, Adam Petty was killed in a practice crash at New Hampshire International Speedway in Loudon, New Hampshire. The tragedy deeply affected the team. Kyle Petty took over what was supposed to be Adam's No. 45 car, and drove it for several seasons in his honor.

Kyle Petty (2001-2008)
Kyle Petty would have sponsorships from Sprint now driving the No. 45 in honor of his son. From 2003 to 2005, he would pick up Georgia-Pacific and Brawny (moving over from the No. 44 team) as his sponsors, but was still unable to bring Petty Enterprises back to its former days. With the addition of both Bobby Labonte and Robbie Loomis in 2006, as well as sponsors Wells Fargo and National Tire & Battery, Petty improved his position to 34th in the points.

For 2007, with the passing of Benny Parsons, Petty would join TNT for six races, dubbed their "Summer Series". During this time, John Andretti returned to the team for four races, and NASCAR Craftsman Truck Series driver Chad McCumbee made his debut at Pocono Raceway. Before his stint in the booth for TNT, Petty had some significant on-track success, finishing third in the Coca-Cola 600, his first Top 5 Cup finish since 1997. After the Centurion Boats at the Glen, Kyle injured his hand in the team's hauler due to punching a desk. Petty would sit out two races while Kenny Wallace and McCumbee filled in. The No. 45 team finished 35th in the 2007 owners points. Kyle Petty in an interview with NASCAR.com said: "I no longer work for the team" when referring to Petty Enterprises.

While the No. 45 car posted no Top 10s and went through multiple sponsors and drivers, it was announced in early December 2008 that Petty Enterprises may cease operations and liquidate its assets since Boston Venture was unable to secure sponsorship for the No. 45. In January 2009, when Petty Enterprises merged with Gillett Evernham Motorsports, the No. 45 team was folded, leaving Kyle Petty with no ride for 2009.

Petty Blue
 
One of the most distinctive features of the No. 43 car is its color. Petty Blue, as it's called, was created by the Petty family. According to Richard, the color was created by accident when they didn't have enough white or dark blue paint to cover the entire car. The resulting mix of white and blue proved to be very popular and remains on the No. 43 car to this day. Previous to that 1958 occurrence, Petty cars were generally white or red.

Car Results (Modern Era)

Car No. 42, 7 Results

Car No. 43, 44 Results

Car No. 44 Results

Car No. 45 Results

See also
 List of NASCAR race wins by Petty Enterprises

References

External links
 Official site
 All-time statistics at racing-reference.info

1949 establishments in North Carolina
2009 disestablishments in North Carolina
American auto racing teams
Defunct companies based in North Carolina
Defunct NASCAR teams
ARCA Menards Series teams
Kyle Petty
Richard Petty
Auto racing teams disestablished in 2009
Auto racing teams established in 1949